Sur, also known as Suri, Zur and Zuri, are a historical Pashtun tribe from among the Lodi living primarily in what is now Afghanistan and Pakistan. The founder of the Suri Empire in India, Sher Shah Suri, belonged to the Sur tribe. They ruled the Suri Empire from 1540 until they were removed from power in 1555 after the Battle of Sirhind by Humayun and the Persian army, who re-established the Mughal Empire.

History
The Suri tribe of the Afghans inhabited the mountains of Ghor east of Furrah and their principal cities were Ghore, Feruzi and Bamian.

See also
 Sur Empire
 Suri (name)
 Pashtun tribes
 Mandesh
 Qais Abdur Rashid
 Amir Kror Suri

Notes

References

External links 
 GHURIDS – Encyclopaedia Iranica

Bettani Pashtun tribes
Pashto-language surnames
Pakistani names